Donald Andrew Hall Jr. (September 20, 1928 – June 23, 2018) was an American poet, writer, editor and literary critic. He was the author of over 50 books across several genres from children's literature, biography, memoir, essays, and including 22 volumes of verse. Hall was a graduate of Phillips Exeter Academy, Harvard, and Oxford. Early in his career, he became the first poetry editor of The Paris Review (1953–1961), the quarterly literary journal, and was noted for interviewing poets and other authors on their craft.

On June 14, 2006, Hall was appointed as the Library of Congress's 14th Poet Laureate Consultant in Poetry (commonly known as "Poet Laureate of the United States"). He is regarded as a "plainspoken, rural poet," and it has been said that, in his work, he "explores the longing for a more bucolic past and reflects [an] abiding reverence for nature."

Hall was respected for his work as an academic, having taught at Stanford University, Bennington College and the University of Michigan, and having made significant contributions to the study and craft of writing.

Life and career

Early life and education
Hall was born in Hamden, Connecticut, the only child of Donald Andrew Hall, a businessman, and Lucy Wells. He was educated at Phillips Exeter Academy, then earned an A.B. magna cum laude from Harvard in 1951, where he was elected to Phi Beta Kappa, and a B.Litt., from Oxford in 1953. Hall received an honorary PhD, Lit. from Bates College in 1991.

Hall began writing even before reaching his teens, beginning with poems and short stories, and then moving on to novels and dramatic verse. Hall continued to write throughout his prep school years at Exeter, and, while still only sixteen years old, attended the Bread Loaf Writers' Conference, where he made his first acquaintance with the poet Robert Frost. That same year, he published his first work. While an undergraduate at Harvard, Hall served on the editorial board of The Harvard Advocate, and got to know a number of people who, like him, were poised with significant ambitions in the literary world, amongst them John Ashbery, Robert Bly, Kenneth Koch, Frank O'Hara, and Adrienne Rich. During his senior year, he won the Glascock Prize that Koch had won 3 years earlier.

After leaving Harvard, Hall went to Oxford for two years, to study for the B.Litt. He was editor of the magazine Oxford Poetry, as literary editor of Isis, as editor of New Poems, and as poetry editor of The Paris Review. At the end of his first Oxford year, Hall also won the university's Newdigate Prize, awarded for his long poem, 'Exile'. In September 1952, he married his first wife, Kirby Thompson, with whom he had his son and daughter.

On returning to the United States, Hall went to Stanford University, where he spent one year as a Creative Writing Fellow, studying under the poet-critic, Yvor Winters. Following his year at Stanford, Hall went back to Harvard, where he spent three years in the Society of Fellows. During that time, he put together his first book, Exiles and Marriages. In 1957, with Robert Pack and Louis Simpson, he edited an anthology which was to make a significant impression on both sides of the Atlantic, New Poets of England and America. It was later juxtaposed with Donald Allen's The New American Poetry 1945–1960. In 1968, he signed the "Writers and Editors War Tax Protest" pledge, vowing to refuse tax payments in protest against the Vietnam War.

While teaching at the University of Michigan in Ann Arbor, Michigan, he met the poet Jane Kenyon, whom he married in 1972. Three years later, the couple moved to Eagle Pond Farm, his grandparents' former home in Wilmot, New Hampshire. Hall and Kenyon were profiled at their home in a 1993 PBS documentary, "A Life Together," which aired as an episode of Bill Moyers Journal. In 1989, when Hall was in his early sixties, it was discovered that he had colon cancer. Surgery followed, but by 1992 the cancer had metastasized to his liver. After another operation, and chemotherapy, he went into remission, though he was told that he only had a one-in-three chance of surviving the next five years. Then, early in 1994, it was discovered that Kenyon had leukemia. Her illness, her death fifteen months later, and Hall's struggle to come to terms with these things, were the subject of his 1998 book, Without. Another book of poems dedicated to Kenyon, Painted Bed, is cited by Publishers Weekly as "more controlled, more varied and more powerful, this taut follow-up volume reexamines Hall's grief while exploring the life he has made since. The book's first poem, 'Kill the Day,' stands among the best Hall has ever written. It examines mourning in 16 long-lined stanzas, alternating catalogue with aphorism, understatement with keened lament: 'How many times will he die in his own lifetime?'"

Hall served as a member of the editorial board for poetry at the Wesleyan University Press from 1958 to 1964. He was closely affiliated with the Bennington College's graduate writing program since 1994, giving lectures and readings annually.

Career

Hall published fifteen books of poetry, most recently White Apples and the Taste of Stone (2006), The Painted Bed (2002) and Without: Poems (1998), which was published on the third anniversary of Kenyon's death. Most of the poems in Without deal with Kenyon's illness and death, and many are epistolary poems. In addition to poetry, he also wrote several memoirs (among them Life Work and String Too Short to be Saved), children's books (notably Ox-Cart Man, which won the Caldecott Medal), and a number of plays. His recurring themes include New England rural living, baseball, and how work conveys meaning to ordinary life. He is regarded as a master both of received forms and free verse, and a champion of the art of revision, for whom writing is a craft, not merely a mode of self-expression. Hall won many awards, including two Guggenheim Fellowships and a Robert Frost Medal, and served as poet laureate of his state. He lived and worked at Eagle Pond Farm.

When not working on poems, he turned his hand to reviews, criticism, textbooks, sports journalism, memoirs, biographies, children's stories, and plays. He also devoted a lot of time to editing: between 1983 and 1996 he oversaw publication of more than sixty titles for the University of Michigan Press alone. He was for five years Poet Laureate of his home state, New Hampshire (1984–89), and among the many other honours and awards to have come his way were: the Lamont Poetry Prize for Exiles and Marriages (1955), the Edna St Vincent Millay Award (1956), two Guggenheim Fellowships (1963–64, 1972–73), inclusion on the Horn Book Honour List (1986), the Sarah Josepha Hale Award (1983), the Lenore Marshall Poetry Prize (1987), the National Book Critics Circle Award for Poetry (1988), the NBCC Award (1989), the Los Angeles Times Book Prize in poetry (1989), and the Frost Medal (1990). He was nominated for the National Book Award on three separate occasions (1956, 1979 and 1993). In 1994, he received the Ruth Lilly Poetry Prize for his lifetime achievement.

Hall was named the fourteenth U.S. Poet Laureate, succeeding Ted Kooser. He served from October 1, 2006, and was succeeded by Charles Simic the following year. At the time of his appointment, Hall was profiled in episode of The News Hour with Jim Lehrer which aired on October 16, 2006. Hall was awarded the 2010 National Medal of Arts by President Barack Obama.

Hall's penultimate work is a 2018 recording of an eleven-song cycle on the topic of mortality, entitled "Mortality Mansions: Songs of Love and Loss After 60." The poems are by Hall and are read by the author, the music is by Grammy Award-winning composer Herschel Garfein.

His last book A Carnival of Losses:  Essays Nearing Ninety was published on July 10, 2018.

Film
Donald Hall was the subject of a short documentary by Paul Szynol called Quiet Hours. He also appeared in Ken Burns's 1994 documentary on baseball.

Personal life
Hall lived at Eagle Pond Farm in Wilmot, New Hampshire, a small town in Merrimack County. He was married to poet and author Jane Kenyon (1947–1995) for 23 years and lived with her until her death. Hall died on June 23, 2018, at the age of 89 at his home in Wilmot.

Selected awards and honors
 1952: Newdigate Prize
 1955: Lamont Poetry Prize, for Exiles and Marriages
 1956: Edna St. Vincent Millay Award
 1956: Nomination for the National Book Award
 1963–1964: Guggenheim Fellowship
 1972–1973: Guggenheim Fellowship
 1979: Nomination for the National Book Award
 1980: Caldecott Medal for Ox-Cart Man
 1984–1989: Poet Laureate of New Hampshire
 1983: Sarah Josepha Hale Award
 1986: Horn Book Honour List
 1987: Lenore Marshall Poetry Prize
 1988: National Book Critics Circle Award for Poetry
 1989: Los Angeles Times Book Prize in poetry
 1990: Robert Frost Medal from the Poetry Society of America
 1991: Honorary Doctor of Letters (in honoris causa) from Bates College.
 1993: Nomination for the National Book Award
 1994: Ruth Lilly Poetry Prize for his lifetime achievement.
 1999: L.L. Winship/PEN New England Award for Without: Poems
 2006–2007: Fourteenth U.S. Poet Laureate
 2010: National Medal of Arts

Bibliography

Poetry
 1952: Exile
 1952: Fantasy Poets Number Four 
 1955: Exiles and Marriages 
 1957: New Poets of England and America
 1958: The Dark Houses 
 1964: A Roof of Tiger Lilies 
 1969: The Alligator Bride 
 1971: The Yellow Room: Love Poems
 1975: The Town of Hill 
 1975: A Blue Wing Tilts at the Edge of the Sea: Selected Poems, 1964–1974
 1978: Kicking the Leaves
 1979: The Toy Bone
 1981: The Wilderness Years
 1986: The Happy Man
 1988: The One Day
 1990: Old and New Poems
 1993: The Museum of Clear Ideas
 1996: The Old Life
 1998: Without
 2000: Two by Two (with Richard Wilbur)
 2002: The Painted Bed
 2006: White Apples and the Taste of Stone
 2011: The Back Chamber
 2015: The Selected Poems of Donald Hall

Essays
 1978: Goatfoot Milktongue Twinbird: Interviews, Essays, and Notes on Poetry, 1970-76
 1983: The Weather for Poetry: Essays, Reviews, and Notes on Poetry, 1977-81
 1985: Fathers Playing Catch with Sons: Essays on Sports (Mostly Baseball)
 1988: Poetry and Ambition: Essays 1982-88
 1995: Death to the Death of Poetry: Essays, Reviews, Notes, Interviews
 1995: Principal Products of Portugal: Prose Pieces
 2014: Essays After Eighty
 2018: A Carnival of Losses: Notes Nearing Ninety (published posthumously)

Biography
 1966: Henry Moore
 1976: Dock Ellis in the Country of Baseball
 1978: Remembering Poets: Reminiscences and Opinions
 1992: Their Ancient Glittering Eyes

Drama
 1965: An Evening's Frost
 1975: Bread and Roses
 1983: Ragged Mountain Elegies

For children
 1959: Andrew the Lion Farmer
 1977: Riddle Rat
 1979: Ox-Cart Man (illustrated by Barbara Cooney)
 1981: The Mooch, A Canine Adventure
 1984: The Man Who Lived Alone
 1994: The Farm Summer 1942 (illustrated by Barry Moser)
 1994: I Am the Dog, I Am the Cat (illustrated by Barry Moser)
 1994: Summer of 1944
 1994: Lucy's Christmas
 1995: Lucy's Summer
 1995: The Pageant (illustrated by Barry Moser)
 1996: Old Home Day
 1996: When Willard Met Babe Ruth 
 1997: The Milkman's Boy

Short stories
 1987: The Ideal Bakery
 2003: From Willow Temple

Memoirs
 1961: String too Short to Be Saved
 1987: Seasons at Eagle Pond
 1992: Here at Eagle Pond
 1993: Life Work
 2005: The Best Day the Worst Day: Life with Jane Kenyon
 2007: On Eagle Pond
 2008: Unpacking the Boxes: A Memoir of a Life in Poetry

Textbooks
 1981: To Read Literature
 1992: To Read a Poem
 1994: Writing Well (later editions with Sven Birkerts)

Recorded
 2018: Mortality Mansions: Songs of Love and Loss after 60  (with Herschel Garfein, Michael Slattery, and Marnie Breckenridge)

Notes

References

External links

"Donald Hall, Poet Laureate of the United States, talks with Robert Birnbaum" on Identity Theory website, posted December 18, 2006
"Between Solitude and Loneliness" by Donald Hall, New Yorker, October 15, 2016
Resources on Donald Hall from the Library of Congress

1928 births
2018 deaths
Alumni of the University of Oxford
American male poets
American Poets Laureate
American tax resisters
Glascock Prize winners
Harvard Advocate alumni
Members of the American Academy of Arts and Letters
Phillips Exeter Academy alumni
Poets from New Hampshire
United States National Medal of Arts recipients
University of Michigan faculty
Wesleyan University people
Writers from New Haven, Connecticut
People from Wilmot, New Hampshire